The Zachariah Allen House is a historic house at 1093 Smith Street in Providence, Rhode Island.  Built in 1789 by Amos Allen for his brother Zachariah Allen, it is a -story wood-frame structure, five bays wide, with a central entry and large central chimney.  It is a well-preserved example of a transitional Georgian-Federal style house, having retained original siding materials on the outside, and finish woodwork on the interior.  Its major modifications include the 20th-century installation of new hardwood floors, as well as modern plumbing and kitchen.  Zachariah Allen was at the time a successful merchant, and the house was built as a summer retreat in what was at the time a rural area.

The building was listed on the National Register of Historic Places in 1994.

See also
National Register of Historic Places listings in Providence, Rhode Island

References

Houses completed in 1789
Houses on the National Register of Historic Places in Rhode Island
Houses in Providence, Rhode Island
1789 establishments in Rhode Island
National Register of Historic Places in Providence, Rhode Island